Elections to the Congress of the Philippines was held on May 11, 1987. Voters elected the members of Congress in the following elections:
1987 Philippine Senate election for all 24 members of the Philippine Senate and
1987 Philippine House of Representatives elections for majority of the members of the House of Representatives of the Philippines.

1987
1987 elections in the Philippines